Kasaya may refer to:
Kashaya (Jainism), a word and concept in Jainism that translates to "passion" or "negative emotions"
Kasaya (clothing), a term for the traditional robes of Buddhist monks
Kasaya (surname)